This is a list of public art in Rhondda Cynon Taf, a country borough in south Wales. This list applies only to works of public art on permanent display in an outdoor public space and does not, for example, include artworks in museums.

Aberdare

Ferndale

Hirwaun

Llanharan

Llantrisant

Llwynypia

Maerdy

Mountain Ash

Penrhys

Pontypridd

Tonypandy

Tonyrefail

Treorchy

References

Rhondda Cynon Taf
Public art